Aminabad (also Romanized as Amīnābād) is a village in Karipey Rural District, Lalehabad District, Babol County, Mazandaran Province, Iran. At the 2006 census, its population was 1,970, in 550 families.

References 

Populated places in Babol County